Graham Tatters (born 28 June 1985 in Elgin) is a Scottish footballer who plays for Hat Yai F.C. in the Thai Second Division.

Career

Youth and College
Tatters was a trainee and youth player at Scottish club Elgin City, and was named Elgin's U-16 Player of the Year in 2001, before moving to the United States to play college soccer at University of North Carolina at Charlotte in 2004. He was named to the A10 All Championship Team and the Davidson Adidas Classic All Tournament Team in 2007, and was his team's Most Valuable Player in 2007 and 2008.

He redshirted his sophomore season in 2005 after being diagnosed with lymphoma, but recovered to continue his college career the following year.

Professional
Tatters turned professional in 2009 when he signed for the Wilmington Hammerheads of the USL Second Division. He made his professional debut on 5 June 2009 in a 1–0 win over the Bermuda Hogges.

Tatters rejoined Elgin City in October 2009, before returning to the United States  in early 2010 to play for FC Tampa Bay in the USSF Division 2 Professional League.

Tatters signed for Singaporean S-League club Woodlands Wellington in 2011, and made his debut for the club on 14 February in a game against Hougang United. He was released by the club in the 2011 off-season.

In 2012, he signed for Hat Yai F.C. and currently plys his trade in the Thai Second Division.

Personal
In 2010 Tatters' became a member of the Live Strong Foundation as a "Global Envoy" helping to raise awareness about issues relating to cancer.

Tatters' father, Graham Tatters Sr., is the former manager of Scottish Highland League club Lossiemouth, and the current chairman of Elgin City.

Married to Dana Clay Tatters from Shelby, NC.

Honors

Wilmington Hammerheads
USL Second Division Regular Season Champions (1): 2009

References

External links
 Wilmington Hammerheads bio
 Infosport soccer combine profile
 Personal website

1985 births
Living people
Scottish footballers
People from Elgin, Moray
Wilmington Hammerheads FC players
Elgin City F.C. players
Tampa Bay Rowdies players
USL Second Division players
Scottish Football League players
Scottish expatriate footballers
Expatriate soccer players in the United States
Association football defenders
Charlotte 49ers men's soccer players
USSF Division 2 Professional League players
Scottish expatriate sportspeople in the United States
Sportspeople from Moray